The Embassy of Afghanistan in Cairo (Persian: سفارت كبرای جمهوری اسلامی افغانستان در قاهره) is the diplomatic mission of the Islamic Republic of Afghanistan to Egypt. It is located at 59 al-Orouba Street, Heliopolis, Cairo, Egypt. It promotes Afghan–Egyptian relations, and performs diplomatic, political, cultural, media, and other bilateral activities. The embassy also provides consular services.

The current Afghan ambassador to Egypt is H. E. Mohammad Moheq. Prior to that, Mr Moheq served as a senior adviser of the President of Afghanistan, for cultural affairs. Mr Moheq also worked with the Ministry of Foreign Affairs of Afghanistan as well as he was a professor at Herat University.

See also
 List of current ambassadors of Afghanistan
 Diplomatic missions of Afghanistan
 Foreign relations of Afghanistan

External links 
 Embassy of Afghanistan in Cairo

Afghanistan–Egypt relations
Buildings and structures in Cairo
Diplomatic missions of Afghanistan
Politics of Egypt
Diplomatic missions in Cairo